Pierantoni is a surname. Notable people with this surname include:

 Giovanni Giacomo Pierantoni (17th century), Italian mathematician
 Grazia Pierantoni-Mancini (born 1841-1843; died 1915), Italian writer and the wife of Augusto Pierantoni
 Augusto Pierantoni (1840-1911), Italian jurist, professor and politician in the Kingdom of Italy
 Piero Pierantoni Cámpora (1932-2009), Peruvian politician